Babingtonia delicata is a shrub endemic to Western Australia.

It is found in the Wheatbelt region of Western Australia near Dandaragan.

References

Eudicots of Western Australia
delicata
Endemic flora of Western Australia
Plants described in 2015
Taxa named by Barbara Lynette Rye
Taxa named by Malcolm Eric Trudgen